Minicosa is a genus of spiders in the family Lycosidae. It was first described in 2007 by Alderweireldt & Jocqué. , it contains only one species, Minicosa neptuna.

References

Endemic fauna of South Africa
Lycosidae
Monotypic Araneomorphae genera
Spiders of South Africa